Denmark–Japan relations are foreign relations between Denmark and Japan. Denmark has an embassy in Tokyo, and Japan has an embassy in Copenhagen. There are 500 Danes who live in Tokyo.

History
 
Diplomatic relations were established after the "Treaty of Friendship, Commerce and Navigation between Japan and Denmark" in 1867. Relations between the countries have been friendly since 1867. However, the bilateral relations were severed in the Second World War. A bilateral agreement was signed in 1952.

Trade

In 1988, the trade between Denmark and Japan reached $2 billion. The main exports from Japan are passenger cars, motorcycles, and computers. Pork, medicines, shrimp, and cheese are the main imports from Denmark. Danish investments in Japan are  Lego and Novo Nordisk.

High level visits
Former Prime Minister Junichiro Koizumi visited Denmark in 2002 and former Prime Minister Anders Fogh Rasmussen visited Japan in 2002 and 2006. Former Prime Minister Yukio Hatoyama made three unofficial visits to Denmark in 2009. Once in connection with Tokyo City's Olympic bid that was decided in Copenhagen that year, and twice in connection with the COP 15 UN conference on Climate Change. Danish Prime Minister Lars Løkke Rasmussen made an unofficial visit to Japan in Spring, 2009.

Franz-Michael Skjold Mellbin

Franz-Michael Skjold Mellbin is a former Ambassador of Denmark to Japan. His term of appointment began September 1, 2008 and he presented his credentials to the Emperor of Japan, Akihito on November 4, 2008.

See also
 Foreign relations of Denmark
 Foreign relations of Japan

References

External links 
 Internationalization and university curricula in Denmark and Japan
 PPH between Denmark and Japan
 Exchange Agreement
 International Bilateral/Multilateral Cooperation Frameworks between India and other countries for cooperation in New and Renewable Energy

 
Japan
Bilateral relations of Japan